Clion is a commune in the Indre department in central France. It was known in the Roman period as Claudiomagus.

The Indre and Ozance rivers flow through the commune.

Population

Residents are known as Clionnais.

See also
Communes of the Indre department

References

Communes of Indre